Allantoma pauciramosa, synonym Cariniana pauciramosa, is a species of flowering plant in the family Lecythidaceae. It is endemic to Brazil. It has only been collected once, in the rainforests in the state of Amazonas.

References

Lecythidaceae
Endemic flora of Brazil
Endangered plants
Taxonomy articles created by Polbot